Duteplase is a plasminogen activator.

References

Hematology